Ariane Cristina Carnelossi (born November 17, 1992) is a Brazilian mixed martial artist who competes in the Strawweight division of the Ultimate Fighting Championship.

Background
Carnelossi enjoyed soccer in her youth, having to give that up after struggling to find time between physical education college and working in a restaurant. When a muay Thai school opened right across the street from home, she immediately fell in love with martial arts. After so much time spent learning the art, Carnelossi's trainer told her how much she stood out and urged her to enter into a tournament. Eventually, this led to taking up jiu-jitsu and blending everything together in MMA, and debuting at age 21 in 2014 – coincidentally enough against fellow future UFC fighter Amanda Ribas.

Mixed martial arts career

Early career
After suffering a loss in her MMA debut against Amanda Ribas at Pentagon Combat 20, Carnelossi went on a 12 bout winning streak, winning 9 of 12 via stoppage. In the process, she also captured the Batalha MMA Strawweight Championship.

Ultimate Fighting Championship
Carnelossi, as a replacement for Istela Nunes, faced Angela Hill on September 21, 2019, at UFC Fight Night: Rodríguez vs. Stephens. Carnelossi lost the fight via TKO due to a doctor's stoppage in the third round after an elbow cut Carnelossi over the left eye and rendered her unable to continue.

After more than two years away due to having surgery for Carnelossi faced Na Liang on April 24, 2021, at UFC 261. She defeated her via ground and pound TKO in the second round.

After her first UFC victory, it was revealed that Carnelossi suffered a slipped disc, the same injury on which she had surgery on in 2020, and UFC PI director of physical therapy Dr. Heather Linden had allowed her to fight with the injury. The pain however returned after the bout and she had surgery on it.

Carnelossi faced Istela Nunes on October 16, 2021, at UFC Fight Night: Ladd vs. Dumont. She won the fight via a rear-naked choke in round three.

Carnelossi faced Lupita Godinez on May 7, 2022 at UFC 274. She lost the fight via unanimous decision.

Championships and accomplishments

Mixed martial arts 

Batalha MMA
BMMA Strawweight Championship (One time; former)

Mixed martial arts record

|-
|Loss
|align=center|14–3
|Lupita Godinez
|Decision (unanimous)
|UFC 274
|
|align=center|3
|align=center|5:00
|Phoenix, Arizona, United States
|
|-
| Win
| align=center| 14–2
|Istela Nunes
|Submission (rear-naked choke)
|UFC Fight Night: Ladd vs. Dumont
|
|align=center|3
|align=center|2:57
|Las Vegas, Nevada, United States
|
|-
| Win
| align=center| 13–2
|Na Liang
|TKO (punches)
|UFC 261 
|
|align=center|2
|align=center|1:28
|Jacksonville, Florida, United States
|
|-
| Loss
| align=center|12–2
|Angela Hill
|TKO (doctor stoppage)
|UFC Fight Night: Rodríguez vs. Stephens 
|
|align=center|3
|align=center|1:56
|Mexico City, Mexico
|
|-
| Win
| align=center| 12–1
| Ketlen Souza
|TKO (body kick)
|Future FC 5
|
|align=center|3
|align=center|3:53
|São Paulo, Brazil
|
|-
| Win
| align=center| 11–1
| Joice Mara
| Decision (unanimous)
|rowspan=2 |Thunder Fight 17
|rowspan=2 | 
| align=center|3
| align=center|5:00
|rowspan=2 | São Paulo, Brazil
|
|-
| Win
| align=center|10–1
| Aline Pires
| KO (punch)
| align=center| 1
| align=center| 1:05
| 
|-
| Win
| align=center|9–1
| Bianca Sattelmayer
| Decision (unanimous)
|Batalha MMA 11
|
| align=center|3
| align=center|5:00
|Bragança Paulista, Brazil
|
|-
| Win
| align=center|8–1
| Kakau Costa
| TKO (punches)
|Max Fight 19
|
|align=center|2
|align=center|2:54
|Campinas, Brazil
| 
|-
| Win
| align=center|7–1
| Gloria de Paula
| Decision (unanimous)
| Thunder Fight 11
| 
|align=center|3
|align=center|5:00
|São Paulo, Brazil
| 
|-
| Win
| align=center|6–1
| Feier Huang
|TKO (punches)
|Glory Of Heroes 7
|
|align=center| 2
|align=center| 4:45
|São Paulo, Brazil
|
|-
| Win
| align=center|5–1
|Weyde Ventura
|TKO (punches)
|MMA Maringa Combat 4
|
|align=center|1
|align=center|0:08
|Maringá, Brazil
|
|-
| Win
| align=center|4–1
| Wellen Taynara
| Submission (keylock)
| Maringa Fight Combat 5
| 
| align=center| 1
| align=center| N/A
| Maringá, Brazil
| 
|-
| Win
| align=center| 3–1
| Ana Paula Ventrilio
|TKO (punches)
|Champions Fight: Costa vs. Tche
|
|align=center|2
|align=center|0:57
|Presidente Prudente, Brazil
|
|-
| Win
| align=center|2–1
| Monique Bastos
|TKO (punches)
|Coliseu Fight Night
|
| align=center|2
| align=center|0:12
|Presidente Epitácio, Brazil
|
|-
| Win
| align=center| 1–1
| Bruna Brasil
| TKO (punches)
|Show Combat MMA 2
|
| align=center|1
| align=center|4:00
|Paranavaí, Brazil
|
|-
| Loss
| align=center|0–1
| Amanda Ribas
| Submission (kneebar)
| Pentagon Combat 20
| 
| align=center| 1
| align=center| 4:14
| Varginha, Brazil
|

See also 
 List of current UFC fighters
 List of female mixed martial artists

References

External links
  
 

1992 births
Living people
Brazilian female mixed martial artists
Strawweight mixed martial artists
Mixed martial artists utilizing Muay Thai
Mixed martial artists utilizing Brazilian jiu-jitsu
Ultimate Fighting Championship female fighters
Brazilian Muay Thai practitioners
Female Muay Thai practitioners
Brazilian practitioners of Brazilian jiu-jitsu